Acacia ulicifolia, commonly known as prickly Moses or juniper wattle is a shrub of the genus Acacia and the subgenus Phyllodineae, native to Australia.

Description

The flowers are pale cream. Flowering period is mid autumn to mid spring.

The common name prickly Moses is a corruption of prickly mimosa.

Taxonomy
Acacia ulicifolia was first described by R.A. Salisbury in 1796 as Mimosa ulicifolia, but in 1957 was placed in the genus Acacia by A.B. Court.

Habitat and ecology

Acacia ulicifolia is found in dry sclerophyll forests and woodlands, usually in sandy soil. It is widespread in New South Wales along the coast and tablelands. It is also found in Queensland, Victoria (Australia) and Tasmania.

See also
List of Acacia species

References

ulicifolia
Flora of New South Wales
Flora of Queensland
Flora of Victoria (Australia)
Flora of Tasmania
Plants described in 1957